Counterattack was a weekly subscription-based, anti-communist, mimeographed newsletter, which ran from 1947 to 1955 and was published by a "private, independent organization" of the same name and started by three ex-Federal Bureau of Investigation agents.

Formation

In May 1947, "a group of former FBI agents" founded a "private, independent organization" called Counterattack.

Description

The full title of the publication was Counterattack: The Newsletter of Facts on Communism.

The weekly subscription-based newsletter headquartered at 55 W. 42 Street, New York.

Counterattack was available by subscription and on news stands and in stores for one dollar in New York City. An annual subscription cost $24. Its target subscribers included "Security Officers, Personnel Directors, Employment managers and all sorts of people whose business requires them to know the facts about the background of organizations and/or individuals." By 1949, Counterattack had earned some $200,000 in revenue.

In 1952, Time magazine reported:[Counterattack] never paid salaries of more than $6,000 a year, and it paid only a few dividends of $1 each on its 1,000 shares of stock. Its special research jobs for corporations, ad agencies, unions, etc. now account for about 5% of its income; the rest comes from Counterattack.

Mission

Its self-proclaimed "principal functions" were to: Publish the newsletter Counterattack, expose "the most important aspects of Communist activity in America each week
 Compile factual information on Communists, Communist fronts, and other subversive organizations
 Assist, consult with, and provide factual information on Communist activities The Columbia Journalism Review has assessed the mission of Counterattack as follows:Counterattack had two missions: one, ostensibly journalistic, the other vigorously interventionist. First, it set out to expose everyone it could find who had any connection, however dubious or tenuous, to anything or anyone associated with Communism, Socialism, the Soviet Union, or progressive ideology. Then, more significantly, Counterattack sought to rally its subscribers to action against the individuals it targeted. In its assault on performers and production personnel in radio and television, Counterattack exhorted its readers to write protest letters to the corporate sponsors of programs featuring actors with purported links to the left.

Counterattack staff
Staff members included:
 John G. Keenan: Ex-FBI agent, publisher of Counterattack, and ABC president.
 Kenneth M. Bierly: Ex-FBI agent, ABC vice president
 Theodore C. Kirkpatrick (AKA "Ted Kirkpatrick"): Ex-FBI agent, managing editor and chief spokesperson of Counterattack (known as "Mr. Counterattack") and BAC secretary-treasurer
 Francis J. McNamara: In 1948, Francis John McNamara (1915–2007), WWII Army intelligence officer and UNRRA staffer in China, began serving as researcher. In January 1950, he became editor of Counterattack through May 1954. (In 1954, he moved to Washington, DC, where he led the National Security Program of the Veterans of Foreign Wars (VFW). He joined the House Committee on Un-American Activities [HUAC] as research analyst [1958], director of research [1961], and staff director [1962]. In 1970, joined the Subversive Activities Control Board (SACB) as executive secretary. In 1981, he became executive director of the Nathan Hale Foundation. In 1987, he became as vice-chairman of the Security and Intelligence Foundation through to 1990. His last role was senior fellow at the Center for Intelligence Studies.
 Herbert Romerstein: In 1951, Romerstein testified before the Senate Sub-Committee on Internal Security on communist youth organizations and before the Subversive Activities Control Board. He became a research analyst and investigator for American Business Consultants, publishers of the anti-communist newsletter Counterattack as well as for Bookmailer, which published his first book, Communism and Your Child, in 1962. From 1965 to 1983, Romerstein served as a staff member for the U.S. House of Representatives. During this interval Romerstein worked as investigator for the House Committee on Un-American Activities (HUAC), as minority chief investigator for the House Committee on Internal Security, and on the staff of the House Permanent Select Committee on Intelligence.

ABC (publisher)

Alfred Kohlberg, an American textile importer and an ardent member of the anti-communist China Lobby, funded the group, registered as American Business Consultants, Inc. (ABC) in 1947, "an extremist group of corporate and ex-government personnel." Affiliates of ABC included Lawrence Johnson (owners of a supermarket chain in upstate New York) and Jack Wren (former Naval Intelligence officer at BBDO advertising agency). (Kohlberg was also an original national council member of the John Birch Society.)

Keenan served as ABC president, Bierly as vice president, and Kirkpatrick as secretary-treasurer.

ABC offered a service costing $5 to investigate people. Newsletter subscribers (clients) included: Bendix Aviation, Du Pont, General Motors, Metropolitan Life, R.J. Reynolds, and F.W. Woolworth.

History

In 1946, Kirkpatrick and Bierly were implicated in "pirating" of security informants for Plain Talk magazine and soon thereafter for Counterattack newsletter. Kirkpatrick and Bierly also used FBI information to capitalize upon their FBI association. Together with Keenan, they formed first "John Quincy Adams Associates" in Washington, DC, and then "American Business Consultants, Inc.", in New York City, publisher of Counterattack newsletter.

On March 26, 1947, FBI director J. Edgar Hoover appeared before the House Un-American Activities Committee (HUAC) to air his views on communism. Hoover said:The mad march of red fascism is a cause for concern in America. But the deceit, the trickery, and the lies of the American communists are catching up with them. Whenever the spotlight of truth is focused upon them the cry, "red baiting." Now that their aims and objectives are being exposed they are creating a Committee for the Constitutional Rights of Communists, and are feverishly working to build up what they term a quarter-million-dollar defense fund to place in ads in papers, to publish pamphlets, to buy radio time. They know that today it is a fight to the finish and that their backs will soon be to the wall.The Communist Party of the United States is a fifth column if there ever was one. It is far better organized than were the Nazis in occupied countries prior to their capitulation. They are seeking to weaken America just as they did in the era of obstruction when they were aligned with Nazis. Their goal is the overthrow of our government. HUAC's investigations gathered momentum after Hoover's speech – and, shortly after that speech, Counterattack launched publishing.

Political counterattacks

As early as December 1947, Counterattack had denounced the presidential aspirations of former U.S. Vice President Henry A. Wallace and his Progressive Party. It tracked other political parties that supported the Progressive Party, including the American Labor Party and the National Farmers Union. It also attacked American labor unions, particularly the Congress of Industrial Organizations (CIO) and the Amalgamated Clothing Workers of America (ACW) and their support (CIO) or not (ACW).

In late March 1948, Counterattack had started to seek to rally its readers to take action against communists and communist organizations.

In May 1948, Counterattack denounced the communist opposition to the Mundt-Nixon Bill.

On July 2, 1948, Keenan and Kirkpatrick testified before the Special Subcommittee of the U.S. House of Representatives Committee on Education and Labor. Kennan described himself as publisher of Counterattack, ABC president, and Brooklyn resident: he also notice service as FBI agent from 1942 to 1948. Keenan further testified that he was a lawyer and partner in the firm of Alexander and Keenan. Kirkpatrick described himself as managing editor of Counterattack, ABC secretary-treasurer, and Queens resident: he noted service as FBI agent from 1941 to 1945. Kirkpatrick further testified that, after the FBI, he had worked for Macy's and then joined ABC in June 1946. They claimed to have some twelve employees, who included other ex-FBI agents. Among them were Jeremiah Buckley (head of research) and Harry Morgan (former vice president of the American Communications Association-CIO union). They stated circulation at that time ran between 1,400 and 1,500 subscribers.

In 1949, Counterattack denounced the Scientific and Cultural Conference for World Peace (July 1949) as a communist-front plot.

By 1949-1950, Ed Sullivan was consulting Counterattack Kirkpatrick for guidance on whom to avoid as a "pinko".

HUAC and Red Channels
In October 1947, the House Un-American Activities Committee (HUAC) began investigating the influence and infiltration of communism in Hollywood, which some regard as a prelude to McCarthyism and others regard as the beginning of the Second Red Scare. A period of blacklisting in the Entertainment industry began with a contempt of Congress charge against the "Hollywood Ten".

American Business Consultants were part of a larger network, which included HUAC, which researched allegedly communist-related activities of individuals and organizations. Composed of several former FBI agents, ABC obtained information from the FBI and had access to the files of HUAC.

On June 22, 1950, Counterattack published a special issue, Red Channels: The Report of Communist Influence in Radio and Television, with intent to "expos[e] the most important aspects of Communist activity in America each week."

Red Channels shook the entertainment industry. Starting in August 1950, Young & Rubicam advertising agency and its radio and television program-sponsoring client General Foods ran into "pinko" issues over The Aldrich Family and The Goldbergs.

In September 1950, Billboard magazine published an exposé "The Inside on 'Counterattack'", which promised the "full story of paper and operators", an "ex-FBI foursome".

Peak

In 1951, Bierly left the newsletter. He claimed that Counterattack had "changed into an opinion and editorial sheet—short on facts and long on opinion." He also admitted that Red Channels had led to "lots of people getting kicked around". He set up his own research outfit with Columbia Pictures as an initial client.

In 1952, Counterattack seems to have peaked at 7,500 subscribers. By late June 1952, Time magazine reported, Kirkpatrick, AKA "Mr. Counterattack", had left the newsletter for "primarily personal reasons".

Decline

In mid-March 1948, actor Fredric March and his wife Florence Eldridge sued Counterattack for defamation and damages of $250,000. Counterattack settled with them out of court–"an expensive lesson" in libel.

The first publication whose accusation against Counterattack for "extortion-style" tactics stuck was a weekly newsletter called In Fact in an article dated July 17, 1950.

Lawsuits against Counterattack seemed to have stopped its publication by 1954, 1955, or 1958 though the organization (and ABC) seem to have survived until 1968 or even 1973.

Archives

The right-wing Church League of America obtained research files from American Business Consultants.

Bloomsburg University's library has made several issues available in PDF format online.

See also

 Plain Talk (magazine)
 Red Channels
 The Red Channels list
 Anti-communism
 Alfred Kohlberg
 China Lobby
 John Birch Society
 Americans Battling Communism
 Newsletter

References

External sources
 
 Bloomsburg University: Counterattack PDFs
 Stanford University: Counterattack; the newsletter of facts to combat communism
 AP Archives: (27 Mar 1947) Story 1, UN News: Communism, 200 UN V20 R25, 27 Mar 1947, b/w, sound

1947 establishments in New York (state)
1955 disestablishments in New York (state)
Anti-communism in the United States
Conservative magazines published in the United States
Defunct political magazines published in the United States
Magazines established in 1947
Magazines disestablished in 1955
Magazines published in New York City
Newsletters
Weekly magazines published in the United States